The Domagnano Treasure is an important Ostrogothic hoard found at Domagnano, Republic of San Marino in the late nineteenth century. The treasure is now divided among various institutions, including the Louvre Abu Dhabi, although the bulk of the hoard is currently held by the British Museum in London and the Germanisches Nationalmuseum in Nuremberg.

Discovery
The treasure was apparently discovered in 1892–1893 at the Lagucci farm near Domagnano in the Republic of San Marino. The exact circumstances of its discovery remain unclear, but it is thought that the hoard was part of one or more graves. The Domagnano Treasure is largely composed of a set of jewellery from the 5th or 6th centuries that may have belonged to an Ostrogothic princess or noble lady of high rank.

Description
The Domagnano Treasure seems to have been made for a royal client as the purity of the precious metals used in its manufacture and the quality of the craftsmanship are very high. The design of some of the jewellery incorporates Christian motifs and also reflects contemporary fashions from the Byzantine Empire and the Gothic period. The treasure is now divided among various museums, as follows:

Germanisches Nationalmuseum in Nuremberg: A fibula in the shape of an eagle, an earring, five pendants from a necklace and a cicada fibula (in the shape of an insect).

British Museum : An earring, three pendants from a necklace, a large and small mount, a pair of knife sheaths, a finger ring, a gold hair pin with flat disk head and a chain necklace.

Museo di Stato di San Marino: A small mount.
Metropolitan Museum of Art in New York: A pendant from a necklace.

Louvre Abu Dhabi: A fibula in the shape of an eagle

Gallery

See also
 Sutton Hoo 
Sutri Treasure
Artres Treasure
Bergamo Treasure

References

Further reading
M. Nawroth, 'Der Fund von Domagnano, Republik San Marino' in Anzeiger des Germanischen National Museum (2000), pp. 89–101
S. Marzinzik, Masterpieces: Early Medieval Art (London, British Museum Press, 2013)
D. Kidd, 'Il tesoro di Domagnano' in I Goti a San Marino. Il Tesoro (Milan, 1995)

Medieval European objects in the British Museum
Medieval European metalwork objects
Domagnano
Collections of the Germanisches Nationalmuseum